The Global Anabaptist Mennonite Encyclopedia Online (GAMEO) is an online encyclopedia of topics relating to Mennonites and Anabaptism.  The mission of the project is to provide free, reliable, English-language information on Anabaptist-related topics.

GAMEO was started in 1996 as the Canadian Mennonite Encyclopedia Online by the Mennonite Historical Society of Canada.  In 2005 the project was renamed to its current title and the scope expanded with the additional partnership of the Mennonite Brethren Historical Commission and the Mennonite Church USA Archives.  The collaboration has since further expanded, with the addition of the Mennonite Central Committee in 2006, the Mennonite World Conference in January 2007, and the Institute for the Study of Global Anabaptism in 2011.

Starting as a database of Anabaptist groups in Canada, GAMEO secured rights to copy and update the Mennonite Encyclopedia published by Herald Press in the 1950s and 1990.  A project goal was to have the entire contents of the Mennonite Encyclopedia, including the supplement volume published in 1990, available on the web.  This was accomplished by February 2009, at which time the encyclopedia contained more than 14,000 articles.  Articles are either adapted from other scholarly works or assigned to knowledgeable authors and then undergo editorial review before publication to the website.

Sam Steiner of Waterloo, Ontario served as managing editor from the encyclopedia's inception until 2012. Richard D. Thiessen of Abbotsford, British Columbia was managing editor from 2012 to May 2017. John D. Roth of Goshen College, Goshen, Indiana was appointed General Editor in May, 2017.

See also 

 Mennonite Historical Library

References

External links 

 

Internet properties established in 1996
Anabaptism
Mennonitism
Christian encyclopedias
Online encyclopedias
1996 establishments in Canada
20th-century encyclopedias
21st-century encyclopedias
American online encyclopedias